John L. Smith is an American attorney who has served in the United States Department of Justice (DOJ) as an assistant United States Attorney, acting United States Attorney, and as head of the department's Public Integrity Section. He was also the chief prosecutor at the Kosovo Specialist Chambers, an international tribunal at The Hague tasked with investigating and prosecuting war crimes in the Kosovo War.

In November 2022, U.S. Attorney General, Merrick Garland, appointed Smith an independent special counsel, responsible for overseeing two preexisting DOJ criminal investigations into former president Donald Trump: an investigation regarding Trump's role in the January 6 U.S. Capitol attack, and an investigation into mishandling of government records, including classified documents.

Early life and education
Smith grew up in Clay, New York, a suburb of Syracuse. In 1987, he graduated from Liverpool High School where he played football and baseball. He earned his Bachelor of Arts summa cum laude from the State University of New York at Oneonta and his Juris Doctor from Harvard Law School in 1994.

Career 
After graduating from law school, Smith joined the Manhattan District Attorney's office, serving as Assistant District Attorney. He was a member of the sex crimes and domestic violence units of the DA's office. He joined the United States Attorney's Office for the Eastern District of New York in 1999. As an assistant U.S. attorney at the Brooklyn-based office, he prosecuted the police officers who sodomized Abner Louima, and secured the death penalty against Ronell Wilson, who murdered two members of the New York Police Department.

From 2008 to 2010, Smith worked as Investigation Coordinator for the Office of the Prosecutor of the International Criminal Court in The Hague. In that position, he oversaw cases against government officials and militia members accused of war crimes and genocide. In 2010, Smith returned to the U.S. to become chief of the U.S. Department of Justice's Public Integrity Section (PIS). Among his first responsibilities was evaluating current investigations, and he recommended closing investigations into several members of Congress. He spent five years as chief of the PIS, where he prosecuted a variety of corruption cases, including those against Virginia Governor Bob McDonnell, U.S. Representative Rick Renzi, New York Assembly Speaker Sheldon Silver, and Jeffrey Sterling, a CIA agent who shared national secrets.

In 2015, Smith became an assistant U.S. attorney in the Middle District of Tennessee, at Nashville. He became the Acting United States Attorney in March 2017 upon the resignation of David Rivera, and resigned effective September 2017 after the nomination of Donald Q. Cochran. Smith became the vice president and head of litigation for Hospital Corporation of America in 2017.

On May 7, 2018, Smith was named to a four-year term as chief prosecutor for the Kosovo Specialist Chambers in The Hague, investigating war crimes committed in the Kosovo War, including the case of Salih Mustafa. He took up the post on September 11, 2018, and was appointed to a second term on May 8, 2022.

United States special counsel 

On November 18, 2022, United States Attorney General Merrick Garland appointed Smith special counsel to oversee the criminal investigations into Donald Trump's actions regarding the January 6 United States Capitol attack, and Trump's handling and storage of government records, including classified documents at his Mar-a-Lago estate. He worked initially from the Netherlands while recovering from a fractured leg which was injured when he was struck by a scooter while cycling. Smith has since returned to the United States.

Awards 
 US Department of Justice Director's Award
 US Attorney General's Award for Distinguished Service
 Federal Bar Association's Younger Federal Attorney Award
 Eastern District Association's Charles Rose Award
 Henry L. Stimson Medal of the New York County Bar Association
 Harvard Law School Wasserstein Fellowship

Personal life
Smith is a competitive triathlete despite not becoming a swimmer until he was in his mid-thirties. In July 2011, he married Katy Chevigny, a documentary filmmaker known for Becoming, an award-winning 2020 documentary of Michelle Obama. They have a daughter. The couple has been living in the Netherlands since 2018.

Notes

References

External links

Assistant United States Attorneys
Harvard Law School alumni
Living people
People from Clay, New York
New York (state) lawyers
State University of New York at Oneonta alumni
International Criminal Court prosecutors
Special prosecutors
January 6 United States Capitol attack
Year of birth missing (living people)